
Gmina Chłopice is a rural gmina (administrative district) in Jarosław County, Subcarpathian Voivodeship, in south-eastern Poland.

Villages
Gmina Chłopice contains the villages and settlements of Boratyn, Chłopice, Dobkowice, Jankowice, Łowce, Lutków and Zamiechów.

Neighbouring gminas
Gmina Chłopice is bordered by the gminas of Jarosław, Orły, Pawłosiów, Radymno, Rokietnica and Roźwienica.

References

Polish official population figures 2006

Chlopice
Jarosław County